Timex Social Club is an American R&B group, formed in 1985 and best known for the 1986 hit single "Rumors".

History
Originally known as the Timex Crew, members included Marcus Thompson (founder), Gregory "Greg B" Thomas, Michael Marshall, Craig Samuel, and Darrien Cleage. By 1986, Samuel, Cleage, and Thomas had departed, Alex Hill and Kevin Moore were added, and the name Timex Social Club was adopted (despite the group's name, Timex Group USA bears no sponsorship of the group). They fused funk and urban R&B. 

In 1986, the group released the Vicious Rumors album on Danya/Fantasy Records (A&M in Canada; Mercury in Germany). It's one major hit, "Rumors", written by Thompson, Hill and Marshall, peaked at #8 on the Billboard Hot 100, #13 in the UK, and No. 1 on the Billboard R&B, Hot Dance Club Play, and Hot Dance/Disco-12 inch Singles-Sales charts. The two follow-up singles, "Thinkin' About Ya" and "Mixed-Up World", reached the R&B Top 20.

Tour
The success of the single "Rumors", prompted hip hop impresario Russell Simmons to hire the group as the opening act for 38 dates on Run DMC's Raising Hell tour in 1986. Other acts on the tour were Beastie Boys, LL Cool J, and Whodini. Besides solo dates, the group also opened for New Edition, Midnight Star, the S.O.S. Band, Kool & the Gang, and Jermaine Jackson.

Split
Timex Social Club disbanded shortly after the success of "Rumors". The band's producer Jay King, Denzil Foster and Thomas McElroy formed Club Nouveau, whose first single was "Jealousy", an answer song to "Rumors" that references Timex Social Club's split. Club Nouveau subsequently had a #1 Billboard Hot 100 hit in 1987 with a go-go cover of Bill Withers's "Lean on Me".

Revival
As of 2011, the current Timex Social Club roster consisted of founding member Marcus Thompson as DJ and Samuelle Prater on vocals.

Discography

Studio albums

Singles

Awards and nominations

See also

 List of number-one hits (United States)
 List of number-one dance hits (United States)
 List of artists who reached number one on the U.S. Dance chart
 List of artists who reached number one on the US Dance chart
 List of artists who reached number one on the Hot 100 (U.S.)
 List of bands from the San Francisco Bay Area

References

Further reading

External links
 
 Official Website
 

African-American musical groups
American contemporary R&B musical groups
American soul musical groups
American boogie musicians
New jack swing music groups
Fantasy Records artists
Music of California
Musical groups established in 1985
A&M Records artists
Mercury Records artists
1985 establishments in California
Musical groups from Berkeley, California